From Now On is the second extended play by American rapper Dreezy. It was released December 25, 2015. The entire EP was produced by Metro Boomin and Southside.

Background
In April 2014, she released her remix of YMCMB rapper Nicki Minaj and Lil Herb's "Chiraq" and received general attention, with many fans claiming that it was better than Minaj's version. The remix later garnered her attention and landed her a collaboration with rapper Common on his tenth studio album Nobody's Smiling. In December 2014, it was announced that Sledge signed a recording contract with Interscope Records, who dropped fellow Chicago rapper Chief Keef a few weeks prior. On July 28, 2015, Dreezy released her debut EP titled Call It What You Want. On December 25, 2015, Sledge released another EP titled From Now On to digital retailers and streaming via Interscope Records.

Track listing
 All tracks produced by Metro Boomin and Southside.

Charts

References

2015 EPs
Albums produced by Metro Boomin
Dreezy albums